Chowmuhani is a city and municipal corporation in Noakhali District, located in Chattogram Division, Bangladesh. It is the administrative centre and capital of the Begumganj Upazila. Chowmuhani is an important businesses hub and trade centre in Noakhali District.

Education
Chowmuhani Government S.A College, established in 1943

References

Populated places in Noakhali District
Begumganj Upazila